Joseph Norbert Denis Rosa (24 May 192620 November 2020) was a Belgian rower. He competed at the 1948 Summer Olympics in London with the men's coxless pair where they were eliminated in the round one repêchage, and also in the coxless four at the 1952 Summer Olympics in Helsinki.

References

1926 births
2020 deaths
Belgian male rowers
Olympic rowers of Belgium
Rowers at the 1948 Summer Olympics
Rowers at the 1952 Summer Olympics
People from Menen
European Rowing Championships medalists
Sportspeople from West Flanders
20th-century Belgian people